Eccles James Gott (4 September 1884 – 15 June 1939) was a Conservative member of the House of Commons of Canada. He was born in Amherstburg, Ontario and became a real estate broker.

Gott attended schools at Amherstburg and Gesto, then secondary school at Essex Centre, Ontario.

He was first elected to Parliament at the Essex South riding in the 1925 general election then re-elected there in 1926 and 1930. Gott was defeated in the 1935 election by Murray Clark of the Liberal party.

References

External links
 

1884 births
1939 deaths
Conservative Party of Canada (1867–1942) MPs
Members of the House of Commons of Canada from Ontario
Canadian real estate agents